Jenaz railway station is a railway station in the municipality of Jenaz, in the Swiss canton of Grisons. It is an intermediate stop on the Rhaetian Railway  Landquart–Davos Platz lines.

Services
The following local and regional trains call at Jenaz:

 RegioExpress:
 hourly service between Disentis/Mustér and Scuol-Tarasp.
 morning rush-hour only service to Landquart.
 Regio:
 Rush-hour service to Scuol-Tarasp.
 Rush-hour service between Landquart and Davos Platz.

References

External links
 
 

Railway stations in Graubünden
Rhaetian Railway stations
Railway stations in Switzerland opened in 1889